Judy A. Lucero (pen name, #21918) was a Chicana prisoner poet, cited as a legend among Latina feminists. Lucero had a particularly tough life, becoming a heroin addict after being introduced to drugs at the age of eleven by one of her stepfathers, losing two children and dying in prison at the age of 28 from a brain hemorrhage.

Poetry
Lucero's poems were published in 1973 in De Colores Journal, Memoriam: Poems of Judy Lucero after her death.

In her poem "I Speak an Illusion" she "articulates the contradictions of her Chicana experience while lamenting the apparently unbreakable bonds that incarcerate her."

Juan Gómez-Quiñones and Irene Vásquez highlight her work as advocating women's strength, such as in "Jail-Life Walk" which they refer to as "simply gripping".

References

American poets of Mexican descent
American people who died in prison custody
Chicana feminists
Year of death missing
Year of birth missing
Prisoners who died in American detention